David Griffith (29 November 1800 – 30 October 1894), known by the bardic name of , was a Welsh poet and Archdruid of the National Eisteddfod of Wales.

Early life

David Griffith was born on 29 November 1800 in Denbigh, Denbighshire, the son of Richard Griffith a watchmaker in that town. Clwydfardd was brought up to work in the same trade. In 1826 he became a local preacher with the Wesleyan Methodists.

Literary legacy
Clwydfardd first came into prominence as a bard in 1824, when he won a silver medal at the Denbigh Eisteddfod for an ode on the Vale of Clwyd. In 1827 he won the prize at the Ruthin Eisteddfod for the best translation of Oliver Goldsmith's The Deserted Village. In August of the same year he 
won a prize for a poem on Difyrwch Helwriaeth (the Pleasures of Hunting).

Clwydfardd's book "Cyfaill yr Ysgolar" (The Scholar's Friend) was published in 1839. It was a guide to the correct use of the Welsh language, and how to use an effective writing style. In 1889 he published an edition of Edmund Prys's Salmau Cân (1621), a metrical translation of the Psalms into Welsh.

Gorsedd career

When the Gorsedd was first invented by Iolo Morganwg in 1792 it was split into four regions or talaith Cadair Gwynedd (north Wales), Cadair Powys (mid-Wales) Cadair Dyfed (west Wales) and Cadair Morgannwg Gwent (south east Wales). Clwydfardd was the first person to be acknowledged as an Arch Druid with seniority over all of the Gorsedds, not just of Wales but of the Isle of Britain and, indeed, the World. There is some difficulty in working out when, exactly, he gained this supremacy. Clwydfardd himself stated: I was appointed Archdruid … in the year 1860; but it was in the Wrexham Eisteddfod in the year 1876 that I was licensed as the Archdruid of the Gorsedd… of the Bards of the Isle of Britain. The Gorsedd's website only acknowledges him as Archdruid from 1888. There is, however little doubt that when he died he was accepted as the one and only Archdruid of Gorsedd Beirdd Ynys Prydain (The Throne of Bards of the Isle of Britain) and all of his successors have enjoyed the same title.
 
There is no extant record of when Clwydfardd was inducted into the Gorsedd, it was probably shortly after his success in the 1824 Eisteddfod. He was first recognised on a national level as a representative of the Gwynedd talaith of the Gorsedd in the National Eisteddfod of 1834 at Cardiff Castle by Taliesin ab Iolo. According to the Merthyr Guardian newspaper dated 31 August of that year, he had walked all the way from Denbigh to Cardiff (about 160 miles) in order to receive his honour.

The following year (1835) an Eisteddfod was held in the Gwynedd talaith in Llanerchymedd, Anglesey, where Clwydfardd was acclaimed to be that Eisteddfod's Chief Bard.

Publications

 An edition of Edmund Prys's Salmau Cân (1621), a metrical translation of the Psalms into Welsh

Biography
A biography of Clwydfardd was published by his great-grandson, also named David Griffith, in 2000.

References

External links

 Bibliographic catalogue entry

1800 births
1894 deaths
19th-century Welsh poets
Calvinist and Reformed poets
People from Denbigh
Welsh Eisteddfod archdruids